Malmyzh (occasionally called Malmış/Малмыш in Tatar) is a town and the administrative center of Malmyzhsky District in Kirov Oblast, Russia, located on the Shoshma River (Vyatka's tributary), near its confluence with the Zasora, Moksha, and Krupny Lach Rivers,  southeast of Kirov, the administrative center of the oblast. Population:

History

It was first mentioned as the Mari village of Malmyzh in the 15th century. Malmyzh was the capital of Mari Malmyzh principality subordinated to Kazan. Mari prince Boltush (Poltysh) offered resistance to Russian offensive and was killed by a cannonball on April 26, 1556. Russian fortress was built here in 1584 to suppress recalcitrant Mari people. It was granted town status in 1780.

Administrative and municipal status
Within the framework of administrative divisions, Malmyzh serves as the administrative center of Malmyzhsky District. As an administrative division, it is incorporated within Malmyzhsky District as the Town of Malmyzh. As a municipal division, the Town of Malmyzh is incorporated within Malmyzhsky Municipal District as Malmyzhskoye Urban Settlement.

References

Notes

Sources

Cities and towns in Kirov Oblast
Malmyzhsky Uyezd
History of Mari El